Extravagance is a lost 1919 American silent drama film directed by Victor Schertzinger and written by John Lynch and R. Cecil Smith. The film stars Dorothy Dalton, Charles Clary, J. Barney Sherry, Donald MacDonald, and Philo McCullough. The film was released on March 16, 1919, by Paramount Pictures.

Plot
From the playbill-

Cast
Dorothy Dalton as Helen Douglas
Charles Clary as Alan Douglas
J. Barney Sherry as Hartley Crance
Donald MacDonald as William Windom
Philo McCullough as Billy Braden

References

External links 

 
 

1919 films
1910s English-language films
Silent American drama films
1919 drama films
Paramount Pictures films
Films directed by Victor Schertzinger
American black-and-white films
American silent feature films
Lost American films
1919 lost films
Lost drama films
1910s American films